The Haudenosaunee Nationals, also known as the Iroquois, competed at the 2022 World Games in Birmingham, United States, from July 7 to 17, 2022.

The only representative team in the 2022 World Games not represented by a National Olympic Committee, they competed in solely in lacrosse.

Competitors

Lacrosse

Originally the Haudenosaunee were not eligible to qualify due to not being represented by a National Olympic Committee. Its men's lacrosse team would have qualified through placing third at the 2018 World Lacrosse Championship. The Haudenosaunee were declared eligible after Ireland vacated their berth in their favor.

Like their men's counterpart, the women's team was deemed eligible to qualify.

Both the men's and women's team failed to make a podium finish.

References

Nations at the 2022 World Games
Iroquois